Stephen Hart Shenker (born 1953) is an American theoretical physicist who works on string theory. He is a professor at Stanford University and former director of the Stanford Institute for Theoretical Physics. His brother Scott Shenker is a computer scientist.

Work
Shenker's contributions to physics include:
 Basic results on the phase structure of gauge theories (with Eduardo Fradkin)
 Basic results on two dimensional conformal field theory and its relation to string theory (with Daniel Friedan, Emil Martinec, Zongan Qiu, and others)
 The nonperturbative formulation  of matrix models of low-dimensional string theory, the first nonperturbative definitions of string theory (with Michael R. Douglas)
 The discovery of distinctively stringy nonperturbative effects in string theory,  later understood to be caused by D-branes.  These effects play a major role in string dynamics
 The discovery of Matrix Theory, the first nonperturbative definition of String/M theory in a physical number of dimensions. Matrix Theory (see Matrix string theory) is an example of a gauge/gravity duality and is now understood to be a special case of the AdS/CFT correspondence (with Tom Banks, Willy Fischler and Leonard Susskind)
Basic results on the connection between quantum gravity and quantum chaos (with Douglas Stanford, Juan Maldacena and others)

Selected works

References

External links
 home page of Stephen Shenker at Stanford
 home page of Stanford Institute for Theoretical Physics 

Living people
21st-century American physicists
Stanford University Department of Physics faculty
American string theorists
MacArthur Fellows
Fellows of the American Physical Society
1953 births
Harvard University alumni
Cornell University alumni